The small pencil-tailed tree mouse or lesser pencil-tailed tree mouse (Chiropodomys pusillus) is a species of arboreal rodent in the family Muridae. It is endemic to Borneo where it is only known from Sabah and Sarawak (Malaysia) and from southern Kalimantan (Indonesia), although it likely occurs more widely.

References

Rats of Asia
Chiropodomys
Endemic fauna of Borneo
Mammals of Borneo
Rodents of Indonesia
Rodents of Malaysia
Mammals described in 1893
Taxa named by Oldfield Thomas
Taxonomy articles created by Polbot